Poland hosted and participated in the Junior Eurovision Song Contest 2020 in Warsaw. Polish broadcaster Telewizja Polska (TVP) was responsible for the country's participation in the contest, and organised the national final Szansa na sukces to select the Polish entry for the contest. The national final was won by Ala Tracz with the song "I'll Be Standing", which represented Poland in the contest. She ended up 9th place with 90 points.

Background

Olivia Wieczorek was selected to represent the nation that year with the song "Nie zapomnij". Olivia finished in 11th place out of 17 entries with 60 points. In , Alicja Rega was selected to represent Poland with the song "Mój dom". She finished 8th out of 16 entries with 138 points.

Before Junior Eurovision

Host bidding phase

After Poland's victory in the  contest on home soil in Gliwice, the director-general of TVP, Jacek Kurski, stated that the country would apply to host the event again in 2020. However, Kurski stated that the possibility of two consecutive editions of the event in Poland could be frowned upon by the European Broadcasting Union (EBU). After a period of uncertainty, in the last week of December 2019, it was reported by Gazeta Wyborcza that some Kraków City Councillors were expressing interest in taking the proposal that the contest be held in the city, focused on Tauron Arena. A few days later on 8 January 2020, the proposal was discussed at the City Council and accepted by the majority of its members. Poland was confirmed as the host country in March 2020.

National final

Format

Szansa na sukces consisted of four shows: three semi-finals broadcast on 6 September, 13 September and 20 September, and a final on 27 September. Seven singers competed in each semi-final, with one qualifying for the final as determined by a jury of artists. Each of the three finalists performed one song selected by the producers and one song that would serve as the Polish entry for the Junior Eurovision Song Contest 2020. The winner was determined by an equal combination of jury votes and SMS votes.

Semi-finals

Semi-final 1

The first semi-final was broadcast on 6 September 2020. All seven semi-finalists performed intergenerational hits. The jury consisted of three members:
Viki Gabor – singer, winner of the Junior Eurovision Song Contest 2019
Edyta Górniak – singer, Polish representative in the Eurovision Song Contest 1994
Piotr Rubik – composer

Semi-final 2

The second semi-final was broadcast on 13 September 2020. All seven semi-finalists performed famous worldwide hits. The jury consisted of three members:
Michał Wiśniewski – singer,  Polish representative in the Eurovision Song Contest 2003 and the Eurovision Song Contest 2006
Cleo – singer, represented  in the Eurovision Song Contest 2014
Gromee – DJ, record producer, remixer, songwriter,  Polish representative in the Eurovision Song Contest 2018

Semi-final 3

The third semi-final was broadcast on 20 September 2020. All seven semi-finaliats performed songs from fairytales. The jury consisted of three members:
Marina Łuczenko-Szczęsna – singer, songwriter, actress
Dawid Kwiatkowski – singer-songwriter
Kasia Łaska – singer, voice actress

Final

The final was held on 27 September 2020. Three artists  competed in the final, and the winning artist and song represented Poland in the Junior Eurovision Song Contest 2020. The jury consisted of three members:
Konrad Smuga (director of Polish performances at Junior Eurovision), Grzegorz Urban (music director of Szansa na Sukces), and Anna Cyzowska-Andura (director of the TVP Entertainment Agency). Another pannel, consisting of Viki Gabor, Cleo and Dawid Kwiatkowski was also present during the show, but did not have any power over the voting.

Artist and song information

Ala Tracz

Alicja "Ala" Tracz (born 25 March 2010) represented Poland in the Junior Eurovision Song Contest 2020 with the song "I'll Be Standing". Prior to Junior Eurovision, Tracz participated in season 3 of The Voice Kids and joined Dawid Kwiatkowski's team.

I'll Be Standing 

"I'll Be Standing" is a song by Alicja Tracz, composed by Gromee and Sara Chmiel-Gromala.

At Junior Eurovision
During the opening ceremony and the running order draw, which both took place on 23 November 2020, Poland was drawn to perform sixth on 29 November 2020, following Belarus and preceding Georgia.

Voting

Detailed voting results

References

Junior Eurovision Song Contest
Junior
Countries in the Junior Eurovision Song Contest 2020